"Broken Windshield View" is a song recorded by American country music singer Chris Lane. It was released in June 2014 as his debut single.

Critical reception
Markos Papadatos of Digital Journal gave the song four stars out of five, saying that it is "reminiscent of Florida Georgia Line meets Dierks Bentley". He wrote that "it has a great deal of energy, and it is fun and radio-friendly, with a rock vibe to it." Taste of Country wrote that Lane "shows vocal range" on the song and called his style "less aggressive than that of [Florida Georgia Line]."

Music video
The music video was directed by Robert Hales and premiered in August 2014.

Charts

References 

2014 songs
2014 debut singles
Chris Lane songs
Republic Nashville singles
Songs written by Rodney Clawson
Songs written by David Lee Murphy
Songs written by Shane Minor
Song recordings produced by Joey Moi
Music videos directed by Robert Hales